Mark Forster (born 25 November 1964) is former professional rugby league footballer who played in the 1980s, 1990s and 2000s.

Playing career

Representative honours
Mark Forster was a Great Britain international, and was capped twice in 1987. He also played for Ireland at the 2000 Rugby League World Cup.

Challenge Cup Final appearances
Mark Forster played left- in Warrington's 14-36 defeat by Wigan in the 1990 Challenge Cup Final during the 1989–90 season at Wembley Stadium, London on Saturday 28 April 1990, in front of a crowd of 77,729.

County Cup Final appearances
Mark Forster played as an interchange/substitute (replacing  Phil Blake) in Warrington's 8-34 defeat by Wigan in the 1985 Lancashire Cup Final during the 1985–86 season at Knowsley Road, St. Helens, on Sunday 13 October 1985, played right- and scored two tries in the 16-28 defeat by Wigan in the 1987 Lancashire Cup Final during the 1987–88 season at Knowsley Road, St. Helens on Sunday 11 October 1987, and played  and scored a try in the 24-16 victory over Oldham in the 1989 Lancashire Cup Final during the 1989–90 season at Knowsley Road, St. Helens on Saturday 14 October 1989.

John Player Special Trophy Final appearances
Mark Forster played  and scored a try in Warrington's 4-18 defeat by Wigan in the 1986–87 John Player Special Trophy Final during the 1986–87 season at Burnden Park, Bolton on Saturday 10 January 1987, and played  and scored two tries in the 10-40 defeat by Wigan in the 1994–95 Regal Trophy Final during the 1994–95 season at Alfred McAlpine Stadium, Huddersfield on Saturday 28 January 1995.

Club career
Mark Forster made his senior début for Warrington in 1983, and went on to score 191 tries in over 450 appearances for the club before being released in 2000. He finished his career with a single season at Widnes Vikings in 2001.

Testimonial match
Mark Forster's Testimonial matches at Warrington took place in 1993 and 2003.

References

External links
!Great Britain Statistics at englandrl.co.uk (statistics currently missing due to not having appeared for both Great Britain, and England)
(archived by web.archive.org) Crooks in trouble
Warrington’s World Cup heroes – Mark Forster

1964 births
Great Britain national rugby league team players
Ireland national rugby league team players
Lancashire rugby league team players
Living people
Place of birth missing (living people)
Rugby league centres
Rugby league wingers
Warrington Wolves players
Widnes Vikings players
Woolston Rovers players